The Nullica River is an intermittently closed semi-mature saline coastal lagoon or perennial river, located in the South Coast region of New South Wales, Australia.

Course and features
The river descends  over its  course.

West of the river's mouth, the Princes Highway crosses the Nullica River.

See also

 List of rivers of Australia
 List of rivers in New South Wales (L-Z)
 Rivers of New South Wales

References

External links
 

Rivers of New South Wales
South Coast (New South Wales)